PBZ may refer to:

 Paclobutrazol, a plant growth regulator and antifungal agent
 People's Bank of Zanzibar, a Tanzanian bank
 Privredna banka Zagreb, a Croatian bank
 Pyribenzamine, a trade name for the drug tripelennamine